Sandown is a seaside resort town on the south-east coast of the Isle of Wight, England. 

Sandown may also refer to:
Sandown, New Hampshire, a town in the United States
Sandown, Gauteng, a suburb of Johannesburg, South Africa
Sandown Park Racecourse, a racecourse in Esher, Surrey
Sandown, Kent
Sandown Castle, Kent in Deal, Kent
Sandown Racecourse, a racecourse in Melbourne, Australia
Sandown Raceway, a motor racing circuit in Melbourne, Australia
Sandown 500, the signature event at Sandown Raceway
Sandown, one of at least two merchant vessels by that name
, one of at least three British naval vessels by that name
Sandown class minehunter, a class of minehunter ships of the Royal Navy